St Abbs Lifeboat is an independent marine-rescue facility in St Abbs, Berwickshire, Scotland.

Independent lifeboat

St Abbs Lifeboat is run as an independent charity (SCIO) registered in Scotland (Charity Number SC046312). The charity operates an independent rescue service outside of the Royal National Lifeboat Institution (RNLI). Thomas Tunnock & Sons Ltd, a Scottish company, has contributed £260,000 towards the purchase of a new lifeboat to be called Thomas Tunnock.

The new St Abbs Lifeboat arrived at the station on 28 July 2016 and was officially named Thomas Tunnock during a naming ceremony on 17 September 2016. Thomas Tunnock is an 900W Rigid Inflatable Boat built by MST (Marine Specialised Technology Ltd) based in Liverpool. She has a maximum speed of 47 knots and is one of the fastest lifeboats in the UK.

Specification of lifeboat

Name: Thomas Tunnock
Manufacturer: Marine Specialised Technology
Model: 900W
Crew: 4
Length LOA: 9 metres
Beam BOA: 3.05 metres
Beam internal: 1.95 metres
Draught: 0.7 metres or 1 metres to base of skegs at 100% fuel and 4 pax
Displacement approx.: 2600kg
Maximum speed: 47 kts
Fual capacity: 2 x 150 litres
Range approx.: 150 nautical miles (173 miles or 278 km)
Construction: Polyester Glass Reinforced Resin (GPR) construction using GRP protected marine ply under deck structure.
Engines: Twin OBM Mercury Optimax 200 HP units modified with PIRS (Post Immersion Restart System)
Survivor capacity: 12

History as an RNLI Lifeboat Station
A campaign to found a lifeboat station in the port was started after the sinking of the S.S. Alfred Erlandsen and the loss of crew in 1907 on rocks, known as the Ebb Carrs, near the shore of the village. Lifeboats were launched from Dunbar Lifeboat Station and Eyemouth but took too long to reach the wreck and all 17 crew members were lost. 

In 1911 the station was established by the RNLI with the formation of a slipway, and the campaign organiser Jane Hay was made secretary of the station in recognition of her effort. The boathouse, still in use today, was added later in 1915. The station's final all weather lifeboat was a 37-foot , on station from 1964 until 1974 when it was withdrawn having averaged only two launches per year and replaced by an inshore D-class lifeboat as the nearby Eyemouth Lifeboat Station had taken on a new fast Waveney-class boat. Since then the station has had a C-class, B-Class and housed the Dorothy and Katherine Barr II Atlantic 75.

Despite a 13,000 signature petition urging them to reconsider, the RNLI withdrew its lifeboat from the station in September 2015. Following a 5-year study, the RNLI decided to replace St Abbs by supplementing the existing Trent-class lifeboat at Eyemouth, 2 miles away, with an additional D-class RIB.

The station's crew received 4 Silver Medals of honour during its service with the RNLI.

Fleet

See also
 Independent lifeboats in Britain and Ireland

References

External links
St Abbs Lifeboat Website.
St Abbs Lifeboat Facebook Page.

Lifeboat stations in Scotland